The Equality Commission for Northern Ireland (Irish: Coimisiún Comhionannais do Thuaisceart Éireann, Ulster-Scots: Equalitie Commission fer Norlin Airlan) is a non-departmental public body in Northern Ireland established under the Northern Ireland Act 1998. "The Commission is responsible for implementing the legislation on sex discrimination and equal pay, race relations, sexual orientation, age, religious or similar philosophical belief, political opinion and disability. The Commission’s remit also includes overseeing the statutory duties on public authorities to promote equality of opportunity and good relations under Section 75 of the Northern Ireland Act 1998."

About 
The commission's vision is "Northern Ireland as a shared, integrated and inclusive place, a society where difference is respected and valued, based on equality and fairness for the entire community".

Its mission is "to advance equality, promote equality of opportunity, encourage good relations and challenge discrimination through promotion, advice and enforcement".

Responsibilities 
"The Commission´s duties and functions are set out in the legislation for which we have responsibility. General duties include:

 working towards the elimination of discrimination
 promoting equality of opportunity and encouraging good practice
 promoting affirmative/positive action
 promoting good relations between people of different racial groups
 overseeing the implementation and effectiveness of the statutory duty on public authorities and 
 keeping the relevant legislation under review."

On 1 October 1999 the Commission took over the functions previously exercised by the Commission for Racial Equality for Northern Ireland, the Equal Opportunities Commission for Northern Ireland, the Fair Employment Commission and the Northern Ireland Disability Council.

Since 1999, a number of new pieces of legislation have been introduced. The commission is now responsible for promoting awareness of and enforcing anti-discrimination law on the following grounds: age, disability, race, sex (including marital and civil partner status), sexual orientation, religious belief and political opinion.

In 2008, the Commission became part of the UK independent mechanism promoting, protecting and monitoring implementation of the United Nations Convention on the Rights of Persons with Disabilities, alongside the three UK national human rights institutions.

Leadership 

Dr Evelyn Collins  serves as Chief executive officer, providing leadership to the commission's senior management team.  In this position, she has spoken out about equal opportunity for women in employment in Northern Ireland, and strengthening equality bodies like the Commission across Europe.

Reactions 
In July 2009 Peter Robinson, leader of the Democratic Unionist Party criticised the commission for having insufficient Protestant representation.  Sinn Féin defended the commission.

See also 
 Equality and Human Rights Commission (England, Scotland and Wales)
 Equality Authority (Republic of Ireland)
 Office of the First Minister and deputy First Minister

References

External links 
 Equality Commission for Northern Ireland

Politics of Northern Ireland
Government of Northern Ireland
Equality Commission for Northern Ireland
Disability rights organizations
Anti-racism in the United Kingdom
Non-Departmental Public Bodies of the Northern Ireland Executive
Northern Ireland peace process